This is a list of governors for Västernorrland County of Sweden, from 1658 to present. Västernorrland was created from the briefly existing Härnösand and Hudiksvall Counties in 1654, which in turn had been separated from Norrland County in 1645.

Footnotes

References

Vasternorrland